The Sym is a left, western tributary of the Yenisey in Krasnoyarsk Krai, Russia.

Course
It flows roughly southeastwards across flat and often boggy areas, forming increasingly wide meanders. About  before the mouth it bends and flows in a roughly ENE direction, finally joining the left bank of the Yenisey between Yarzevo and Krivlyak.  

The river freezes in October or early November and stays frozen until May. Its main tributaries are the Alsym, Kukocha, Oksym and Kolchum from the right and the Kidenches from the left. The settlement of Maiskoye is by the Kolchum.

History
Historically the Sym was first reached by Ket serving men in 1605, while a detachment from Mangazeya ascended the Yenisei to its confluence with the Sym in 1610.

See also
List of rivers of Russia
Ket River

References

External links

Rivers of Krasnoyarsk Krai